The Aeros Mister X is a Ukrainian single-place, paraglider that was designed and produced by Aeros of Kyiv.

Design and development
The Mister X was intended as an intermediate paraglider and was in production in 2003, but is no longer available. The variant number indicates the wing area in square metres, rounded off to the nearest whole number.

Variants
Mister X 25
Mister X 27
Mister X 30

Specifications (Mister X 25)

References

Paragliders
Mister X